Mind Fusion is a 5-volume series of albums produced by Madlib.

Volume 1

Mind Fusion Vol. 1 is the first of the Mind Fusion series of mixtapes and remixes by West Coast hip hop producer Madlib. As every mixtape follows a different genre of music, the first in the series focuses on hip hop songs produced and remixed by Madlib. It was released in CD format independently on Madlib's Mind Fusion imprint. It also features vocals from fellow Stones Throw artists.

Track list

All tracks are produced, remixed, and arranged by Madlib.

 "Mind Fusions (Intro)"
 "All Night" (featuring Wildchild, Declaime and MED)
 "The Omen (Madlib Remix)" (featuring Aim)
 "I Got A Right Ta (Madlib Remix)" (featuring Common)
 "Money Folder (12-inch Remix)" (featuring Madvillain)
 "Never Saw It Coming" (from Push Comes to Shove) - (featuring MED)
 "Galt Suite No. 7"
 "Uh Huh (Madlib Remix)" (featuring Method Man)
 "Stomp the Shit Out You (Madlib Remix)" (featuring M.O.P.)
 "Steal This Beat (Instrumental)"
 "Yo’ Soul" (featuring Dudley Perkins)
 "Hydrant Game" (from The Further Adventures of Lord Quas) - (featuring Quasimoto)
 "Ain’t Right" (featuring Diverse)
 "Who You Be? (Madlib Remix)" (featuring Outsidaz)
 "Beer Games" (featuring Madvillain and Jaylib)
 "Feel It" (from Secondary Protocol) - (featuring Wildchild)
 "The Payback (Gotta)" (from Beat Konducta Vol 1–2: Movie Scenes)
 "WTF (Madlib Remix)" (featuring Oh No and Wildchild)
 "Montara (Remix)" (featuring Bobby Hutcherson)
 "Keeps It Krisp" (featuring Kazi)
 "Now U Know" (from Push Comes to Shove) - (featuring MED)
 "Space Goat (Madlib Remix)" (featuring Diverse)
 "Home Turf (Madlib Remix)" (featuring Charizma)
 "Offbeat (Groove)" (from Beat Konducta Vol 1–2: Movie Scenes)
 "Right Now" (featuring Oh No)
 "Duck Sex (Outro)"

Volume 2

Mind Fusion Vol. 2 is second of the Mind Fusion series. This mixtape was released by Madlib under his Mind Fusion imprint. It is a compilation of many songs from different genres from the '60s to the '80s. Like other Mind Fusion mixtapes, this mixtape was released in very limited quantities and is a very rare and collectible item today.

Track listing

All tracks are compiled and mixed by Madlib.

{| class="wikitable" border="1"
!width="70"|CD Track
!width="15"|#
!width="200"|Artist
!width="200"|Title
!width="200"|Album
!width="60"|Year
|-
|1||1||Nat Adderley||Song of the Valdez Diamond||Double Exposure||1975
|-
| ||2||Brian Auger's Oblivion Express||Beginning Again||Straight Ahead||1975
|-
| ||3||Johnny Hammond||Back to the Projects||Gambler's Life||1974
|-
| ||4||Calvin Keys||Shawn-Neeq||Shawn-Neeq||1971
|-
| ||5||Cesar Mariano & Cia.||Metropole||São Paulo Brasil||1977
|-
| ||6||Human Egg||Love Like This||Human Egg||1978
|-
| ||7||Michal Urbaniak's Fusion||Ilex||Atma||1974
|-
| ||8||Peter Lipa||My Album||Moanin||1984
|-
| ||9||Mary Lou Williams||Pale Blue||Free Spirits||1975
|-
|2||10||Henry Franklin||Cosmos Dwellers||Tribal Dance||1977
|-
| ||11||Azymuth||Partido Alto||Light as a Feather||1979
|-
| ||12||Elvin Jones||Moon Dance||Time Capsule||1977
|-
| ||13||Patrice Rushen||Before the Dawn||Before the Dawn||1975
|-
| ||14||Juju||Nia (Complete the Circle)||Chapter Two: Nia||1974
|-
| ||15||Marcos Valle||Não Tem Nada Não (Instrumental)||Previsão do Tempo||1973
|-
| ||16||Azar Lawrence||Theme for a New Day||People Moving||1976
|-
|3||17||Cortex||Automne||Troupeau bleu||1975
|-
| ||18||Joyce||Longe do Tempo||Encontro Marcado||1969
|-
| ||19||Jackie McLean||Soul||'Bout Soul||1967
|-
| ||20||Ennio Morricone||Dies irae psichedelico||Escalation||1968
|-
| ||21||Ken Rhodes||The Profile||Profile||1974
|-
| ||22||Stefano Torossi||Fearing Much||Feelings||1975
|-
| ||23||Duke Ellington||Digeridoo||The Afro-Eurasian Eclipse||1971
|-
| ||24||Marcos Valle||Azimuth||Mustang Côr de Sangue||1969
|-
| ||25||Bayete Umbra Zindiko Quintet||Let It Take Your Mind||Seeking Other Beauty||1972
|-
| ||26||Azymuth||Nothing Will Be as It Was (Nada Será Como Antes)||Telecommunication||1982
|-
| ||27||Jackie McClean||Soul||Bout Soul||1967
|-
|-
| ||28||Lorez Alexandria||Baltimore Oriole||How Will I Remember You||1978
|-
| ||29||Pharoah Sanders/Norman Connors||Casino Latino||Beyond a Dream||1978
|-
| ||30||George Duke||Nigerian Numberuma||The Inner Source||1971
|-
| ||31||George Duke||Feels So Good||The Inner Source||1971
|-
| ||32||Jackie McClean||Soul||Bout Soul||1967
|-
| ||33||Willie Tee and the Gaturs||Concentrate||[B-side of single "Get Up"]||1980
|-
| ||34||Egberto Gismonti||Janela de Ouro
|Sonho 70||1970
|-
| ||35||Cal Green||Revolution Rap - Part 2||[single]||1967
|}

Volume 3Mind Fusion Vol. 3 is compilation mixtape by hip hop producer Madlib independently released in 2005. This album is a mix-up of Funk, Jazz, Dub and hip hop instrumentals released in a total of 8 tracks on CD format.

Track list

 "Just A" - 5:25
 "Collection" - 6:33
 "Of The" - 8:25
 "Hottest" - 5:02
 "Shit" - 11:49
 "Madlib" - 10:07
 "Has Ever" - 7:02
 "Produced" - 3:23

Volume 4Mind Fusion Vol. 4 is a remix album by hip hop producer Madlib independently released in 2007. This album features remixes of songs by Nas and Jay-Z and others.

Track list

Track list adapted from Rappcats.com.

Volume 5Mind Fusion Vol. 5'' is the fifth and last mixtape of the Mind Fusion series by hip hop producer Madlib. This mixtape focuses on "dirty hip hop crates" from around the world as stated on the back cover. Following tradition, this mixtape was also independently released by Madlib on his Mind Fusion imprint in CD format.

Track list

The whole album features only two lengthy tracks which have about 10 to 15 different beats each mixed together.Track 1 - Dirty Crates From Around The World (35:58)Track 2 - Live At The Do-Over''' (36:55)

2000s mixtape albums
Hip hop compilation albums
Stones Throw Records compilation albums
2004 remix albums
Stones Throw Records remix albums
Jazz compilation albums
Hip hop remix albums
Jazz remix albums
Compilation album series